The fractal transform is a technique invented by Michael Barnsley et al. to perform lossy image compression.
This first practical fractal compression system for digital images resembles a vector quantization system using the image itself as the codebook.

Fractal transform compression 

Start with a digital image A1.
Downsample it by a factor of 2 to produce image A2.
Now, for each block B1 of 4x4 pixels in A1, find the corresponding block B2 in A2 most similar to B1, and then find the grayscale or RGB offset and gain from A2 to B2.
For each destination block, output the positions of the source blocks and the color offsets and gains.

Fractal transform decompression 
Starting with an empty destination image A1, repeat the following algorithm several times:
Downsample A1 down by a factor of 2 to produce image A2. Then copy blocks from A2 to A1 as directed by the compressed data, multiplying by the respective gains and adding the respective color offsets.

This algorithm is guaranteed to converge to an image, and it should appear similar to the original image.
In fact, a slight modification of the decompressor to run at block sizes larger than 4x4 pixels produces a method of stretching images without causing the blockiness or blurriness of traditional linear resampling algorithms.

Patents 
The basic patents covering Fractal Image Compression, U.S. Patents 4,941,193, 5,065,447, 5,384,867, 5,416,856, and 5,430,812 appear to be expired.

See also
Image compression

External links
E2 writeup

Fractals